The Government Law College, Ernakulam, also known as His Highness the Maharajas Government  Law College, Ernakulam is an prestigious institution for undergraduate and post-graduate legal education in , Kerala, India. Founded in 1874, it is the first law college in the state of Kerala.It is one of the oldest law colleges in India. The Campus is situated on the banks of Vembanad Lake and is near to Marine Drive and High Court of Kerala. Blanketed by tall and rare species of trees, its campus features a mix of old and modern architecture. The college is recognised by Bar Council of India  and affiliated to the Faculty of Law, Mahatma Gandhi University in Kottayam and is a reputed Research Centre in Law. The college’s prestigious alumni includes former Chief Justice of India K. G. Balakrishnan, Noted Indian actor Padma Shree Mammootty, former Defence Minister of India A. K. Antony , and former Chief Minister of Kerala Oommen Chandy. It is popularly known as Ernakulam Law College  or Maharajas Law College.

History
Government Law College's history began in 1874 when legal education was started in Kerala by the Maharajah of Cochin sanctioning the organisation of a law class in connection with His Highness College Cochin. This was intended to enable candidates from Cochin to present themselves for the law examination of Madras University. Those law classes continued until 1894, when the institution was reorganised entirely. The college was shifted to Thiruvananthapuram and raised to the status of an independent college as His Highness the Maharajah's Law College, Thiruvananthapuram, with W.T.A. Cosby, bar-at-law (judge of the High Court of Travancore who was appointed as professor of law in 1892) as the first principal. A complete set of rules was formulated by the government for the control and regulation of work in the college. The rules prescribed the qualification for members of the teaching staff.

The college was maintained by the Maharajah of Travancore from the beginning and managed until 1909, when it was placed under the Direction of the Public Instruction. In 1910, the college came under the High Court of Travancore. With the inauguration of the Travancore University in 1938, the college was transferred to the control of the university. In 1957, the Kerala University was formed and the college came under it. In 1983, with the establishment of Mahatma Gandhi University at Kottayam, the college became a constituent college of that university and is now affiliated to it.

In August 1949, the college was moved to Ernakulam to fit it with the integration of the former states of Thiruvithamkoor and Kochi and the consequent moving of the Travancore-Cochin High Court from Thiruvananthapuram to Ernakulam. The college has been housed in the old assembly building of Kochi state at Ernakulam since 1949. The college celebrated the centenary of legal education in 1975. In July 1954, a second law college was started at Thiruvananthapuram.

In 1967/68, the three-year LL.B. course was started and the title of the degree of M.L. was changed to LL.M. During 1968/69, the two-year B.L. degree course was abolished. A part-time course for the three-year LL.B. started during 1968/69 but was abolished in 2002.

To commemorate the move of the Law College back to Ernakulam, the college celebrated its Golden Jubilee in 1999.

Courses

B.Com., LL.B (Hons) 
This is a five-year integrated law course, leading to a B.Com., LL.B (Hons). Each year consist of two semesters. The student earns the integrated B.Com. LL.B. degree after completing the tenth semester, i.e., upon successful completion of five years. This course is being introduced from the academic year 2016–17.

LL.B 3 Year Degree
This is a three-year law course, leading to the award of an honours degree. The course structure is divided into six semesters over three years. qualification degree.

LL.M
The LL.M. course enables students to develop their interests in many of the major areas of law to which they have been introduced in the LL.B. course, and also provides the opportunity to study important aspects of specialized areas of law in The duration of the course is two years. At present, the college is offering instruction in two branches of law in the LL.M degree, Criminal Law and Commercial Law.

Campus

The Campus situated on the banks of Vembanad Lake and near to Marine Drive, Kochi and District Court Ernakulam. Blanketed by tall and rare species of trees, its campus features a mix of old and modern architecture.
The main block of the law college is the grand old legislative hall of Cochin Legislative Council. In 1949, when the college was shifted from Trivandrum to Ernakulam, the legislative hall became the part of His Highness the Maharaja's Law College.

The college enrols over 700 students for the LL.B course and 30 students for the LL.M course.

In 2006, the government declared the campus a heritage site and offered Rs. 50,00,000 for its renovation which is still in progress. The library building includes the computer laboratory. All classrooms are equipped with microphones and speakers for better audibility. WiFi is available for the students' use.

Library
The Government Law College, Ernakulam has one of the oldest law libraries in the country today. The institution has a full-fledged library which has more than 37,000 Volumes and 22 periodicals and is the oldest law library in the state of Kerala. The library has subscriptions to online journals such as Manupatra, CDJ Law Journal, SCC Online, Lexis Nexis (India), Lex Libraria and Hein Online. It also has offline databases of AIR Infotech and KLT Infotech.

Hostels
Government Law College, Ernakulam has both men's and women's hostels. The men's hostel which is metaphorically named House of Lords is a live and cheerful space in the city situated in Colombo Jn. on the rear side of the campus.

It often finds a mention in the dailies as a hub of creative activities and out of the box thinking. It accommodates 80 students.  The women's hostel is placed adjacent to the college campus which is also a happy space where about 30 students stay.

Controversy 
In 2016, in a reply to a RTI application sent by one of the student, Bar Council of India stated that the five-year integrated  B.A. (Criminology) LL.B (Hons) course which started in 2011 is not recognized by UGC which means that the students will not be eligible to get enrolled as Advocates, even if they complete the course successfully.  After the university made necessary changes to the syllabus, the course was given recognition.The said course was titled as  B.A., LL.B(5 year Integrated Law Degree course. The said course was replaced with five-year integrated B.Com LL.B (Hons) degree for new batches from academic year 2016–17.

Notable alumni

Judiciary
 Justice K. G. Balakrishnan, Former Chief Justice of India

 Justice K. M. Joseph, Judge, Supreme Court of India
 K. K. Usha, Former Chief Justice, High Court of Kerala
 K. Sukumaran (judge), Former judge Mumbai High court 
 Justice J. B. Koshy, Former Chief Justice of Patna High Court & Kerala High court 
 Justice Gopinath P, judge, Kerala High Court
 Pius C. Kuriakose, Honorable Judge, Lokayukta
 Justice Anu Sivaraman, judge, Kerala High Court
 Justice Sunil Thomas, judge, Kerala High Court
 Justice A.K. Jayasankaran Nambiar, Judge, Kerala High Court
 Justice B. Sudheendra Kumar, judge, Kerala High Court
 Justice Babu Mathew P. Joseph, Former Judge, High Court of Kerala
 Justice P. N. Ravindran, Former Judge, High Court of Kerala
 Justice P. R. Ramachandra Menon,  Chief Justice, High Court of Chhattisgarh
 Justice Narayana Pisharadi R, Judge, High Court of Kerala
 Justice Devan Ramachandran, Judge, High Court of Kerala
 Justice V. Shircy, Judge, High Court of Kerala
 Justice Shaji P. Chaly, judge of Kerala High Court
 Justice Mary Joseph, Judge, High Court of Kerala
 Justice N. Nagaresh, Judge, High Court of Kerala
 A. K. Jayasankaran Nambiar, Judge, High Court of Kerala
 Justice Bechu Kurian Thomas, Judge, High Court of Kerala
  Justice M. R. Anitha, Judge, High Court of Kerala
  Justice Haripal, Judge, High Court of Kerala
 Murali Purushothaman, Judge, High Court of Kerala

Government
 A K Antony, Former Union Defence Minister of India and Former Chief Minister of Kerala

 Oommen Chandy, former Chief Minister State of Kerala

 K. R. Gowri Amma, First Women Minister in the State of Kerala

 Vayalar Ravi, former Union Cabinet Minister

 P Rajeev, Law Minister of Kerala State

 E. Chandrasekharan Nair, Senior Leader of CPI, former Food and Civil Supplies Minister

 Jose Thettayil, Former Minister for Transport, Government of Kerala

 K. P. Viswanathan, Former Minister for Forests & Wildlife Government of Kerala

Legislators
 Anto Antony, Member of Parliament

 P. T. Thomas, Former member of the Kerala Legislative Assembly
 
 A. C. Jose, former Speaker of Kerala Legislative Assembly

 Therambil Ramakrishnan, former Speaker of KLA

 Varkala Radhakrishnan, former MP and Speaker of KLA

 Simon Britto Rodrigues, Politician, writer, former member of the Kerala Legislative Assembly

 Thomas Kallampally, Former member of the Kerala Legislative Assembly

 U. A. Latheef, member of the Kerala Legislative Assembly

 P. C. George, Former member of the Kerala Legislative Assembly

Malayalam Film Industry
 Mammootty, Indian Film Actor

 Sachy (writer), Malayalam Film Industry
 Baburaj (actor), Malayalam Film Industry
 Rohini Mariam Idicula, Actress, Model

Others
 B.Raman Pillai, Renowned Criminal Lawyer 
 N. R. Madhava Menon, Indian civil servant, Lawyer and Legal educator
 M. N. Vijayan, Famous Malayalam writer and Kerala Sahithya Academy Award winner 
 K. P. Dandapani, former advocate general of Kerala
 TG Mohandas, Journalist 
 Porinju Veliyath, Naturalist
 Bindu Ammini, Lawyer, Professor
 A Jayashankar, Advocate, Political Journalist
 Farha Mather, Lawyer, International Badminton player

In popular culture
 Manju Warriar starring C/O Saira Banu shooting took place in Government Law College Ernakulam where the protagonist Joshua Peter is studying (Shane Nigam)
 Mamooty starring Puthan Panam shooting took place in Government Law College Ernakukam where in all the Court scenes are taken.

References

External links

Universities and colleges in Kochi
1874 establishments in India
Educational institutions established in 1874
Law schools in Kerala